Pizhai is a 2020 Tamil language film directed by Rajavel Krishna in his directorial debut. The film stars Ramesh, Appa Nasath, and newcomer Gokul in the lead roles.

Synopsis 
The film is about three boys: Vedi, Kodi, and Mayilu. They don't want to study and run away from their homes. Their experiences in the outside world make them realize their mistakes. A man approaches them and asks them to work. They agree only to be mistreated. When trying to escape, they lose someone. They go allmover and experience similar mishaps. When police returns two of the boys, they ask the other's whereabouts. Then they find out that the other boy has met his end.

Cast

Production 
The film stars Ramesh, Nasath, and Gokul as in important roles. Charle, Mime Gopi, and George play supportive roles in the film as parents who can't afford education for their kids. The film was shot in Chennai, Krishnagiri, Dharmapuri, Chitoor, and Tiruthani.

Soundtrack
Soundtrack was composed by FS Faisal.
Motor Illai - Velmurugan
Sudum Varai - Keshav
Ippadiye - Keshav, Priyanka
Nee Irundha - Keshav

Release 
The Times of India gave the film one out of five stars and states that "The lack of fresh sequences and the number of unnecessary sub-plots, do not evoke any interest in the audience". The Deccan Chronicle gave the film two-and-a-half out of five stars and wrote that "Pizhai has good intentions but the execution is found wanting".

References

External links
 

Indian drama films
Indian children's films
2020 directorial debut films
2020 films